The Ven.  John William Wingfield (19 December 1915 – 23 December 1983) was an Anglican priest: the Archdeacon of Bodmin from 1979 to 1981.

Wingfield was educated at the Sheffield Pupil Teacher Centre; and served in the Royal Army Service Corps during World War II. After a curacy at Madron with Morvah he held incumbencies at Perranuthnoe, Budock, St Michael Caerhays, Redruth and St Clement before his Archdeacon’s appointment.

References

1915 births
Clergy from Sheffield
People educated at The City School, Sheffield
Royal Army Service Corps officers
1983 deaths
Archdeacons of Bodmin
British Army personnel of World War II